Dmytro Yehorov (born 2 December 1930) is a former Soviet athlete. He competed in the men's hammer throw at the 1956 Summer Olympics.

References

External links

1930 births
Possibly living people
Athletes (track and field) at the 1956 Summer Olympics
Soviet male hammer throwers
Olympic athletes of the Soviet Union
Place of birth missing (living people)